The Diggers were a group of religious and political dissidents in England, associated with agrarian socialism. Gerrard Winstanley and William Everard, amongst many others, were known as True Levellers in 1649, in reference to their split from the Levellers, and later became known as Diggers because of their attempts to farm on common land.

Their original name came from their belief in economic equality based upon a specific passage in the Acts of the Apostles. The Diggers tried (by "levelling" land) to reform the existing social order with an agrarian lifestyle based on their ideas for the creation of small, egalitarian rural communities. They were one of a number of nonconformist dissenting groups that emerged around this time.

The Diggers were driven from one colony after another by the authorities.

Theory
In 1649, Gerrard Winstanley and 14 others published a pamphlet, in which they called themselves the "True Levellers" to distinguish their ideas from those of the Levellers. Once they put their idea into practice and started to cultivate common land, both opponents and supporters began to call them "Diggers". The Diggers' beliefs were informed by Winstanley's writings which envisioned an ecological interrelationship between humans and nature, acknowledging the inherent connections between people and their surroundings; Winstanley declared that "true freedom lies where a man receives his nourishment and preservation, and that is in the use of the earth".

The True Levellers advocated for an early form of public health insurance and communal ownership in opposition to individual ownership.

They rejected the perceived immorality and sexual liberalism of another sect known as the Ranters, with Gerrard Winstanley denoting them as "a general lack of moral values or restraint in worldly pleasures".

Practice

St George's Hill, Weybridge, Surrey

The Council of State received a letter in April 1649 reporting that several individuals had begun to plant vegetables in common land on St George's Hill, Weybridge near Cobham, Surrey at a time when harvests were bad and food prices high. Sanders reported that they had invited "all to come in and help them, and promise them meat, drink, and clothes." They intended to pull down all enclosures and cause the local populace to come and work with them. They claimed that their number would be several thousand within ten days. "It is feared they have some design in hand." In the same month, the Diggers issued their most famous pamphlet and manifesto, called "The True Levellers Standard Advanced".

Where exactly in St. George's Hill the Diggers were is a matter of dispute. Sanders alleges that they worked "on that side of the hill next to Campe Close." George Greenwood, however, speculated that the Diggers were "somewhere near Silvermere Farm on the Byfleet Road rather than on the unprofitable slopes of St. George's Hill itself."

Winstanley remained and continued to write about the treatment they received. The harassment from the Lord of the Manor, Francis Drake (not the famous Francis Drake, who had died more than 50 years before), was both deliberate and systematic: he organised gangs in an attack on the Diggers, including numerous beatings and an arson attack on one of the communal houses. Following a court case, in which the Diggers were forbidden to speak in their own defence, they were found guilty of being sexually liberal Ranters (though in fact Winstanley had reprimanded Ranter Laurence Clarkson for his sexual practices). If they had not left the land after losing the court case then the army could have been used to enforce the law and evict them; so they abandoned Saint George's Hill in August 1649, much to the relief of the local freeholders.

Little Heath near Cobham
Some of the evicted Diggers moved a short distance to Little Heath in Surrey.  were cultivated, six houses built, winter crops harvested, and several pamphlets published. After initially expressing some sympathy for them, the local lord of the manor of Cobham, Parson John Platt, became their chief enemy. He used his power to stop local people helping them and he organised attacks on the Diggers and their property. By April 1650, Platt and other local landowners succeeded in driving the Diggers from Little Heath.

Wellingborough, Northamptonshire
There was another community of Diggers close to Wellingborough in Northamptonshire. In 1650, the community published a declaration which started:
A Declaration of the Grounds and Reasons why we the Poor Inhabitants of the Town of Wellingborrow, in the County of Northampton, have begun and give consent to dig up, manure and sow Corn upon the Common, and waste ground, called Bareshanke belonging to the Inhabitants of Wellinborrow, by those that have Subscribed and hundreds more that give Consent....

This colony was probably founded as a result of contact with the Surrey Diggers. In late March 1650, four emissaries from the Surrey colony were arrested in Buckinghamshire bearing a letter signed by the Surrey Diggers including Gerrard Winstanley and Robert Coster inciting people to start Digger colonies and to provide money for the Surrey Diggers.  According to the newspaper A Perfect Diurnall the emissaries had travelled a circuit through the counties of Surrey, Middlesex, Hertfordshire, Bedfordshire, Buckinghamshire, Berkshire, Huntingdonshire and Northamptonshire before being apprehended.

On 15 April 1650 the Council of State ordered Mr Pentlow, a justice of the peace for Northamptonshire to proceed against "the Levellers in those parts" and to have them tried at the next Quarter Session. The Iver Diggers recorded that nine of the Wellingborough Diggers were arrested and imprisoned in Northampton jail and although no charges could be proved against them the justice refused to release them.

Captain William Thompson, the leader of the failed "Banbury mutiny", was killed in a skirmish close to the community by soldiers loyal to Oliver Cromwell in May 1649.

Iver, Buckinghamshire
The Iver Diggers' "Declaration of the grounds and Reasons, why we the poor Inhabitants of the Parrish of Iver in Buckinghamshire ..." revealed that there were further Digger colonies in Barnet in Hertfordshire, Enfield in Middlesex, Dunstable in Bedfordshire, Bosworth in Leicestershire and further colonies at unknown locations in Gloucestershire and Nottinghamshire. It also revealed that after the failure of the Surrey colony, the Diggers had left their children to be cared for by parish funds.

Influence

The San Francisco Diggers were a community-action group of activists and Street Theatre actors operating from 1966 to 1968, based in the Haight-Ashbury neighborhood of San Francisco.

Since the revival of anarchism in the British anti-roads movement, the Diggers have been celebrated as precursors of land squatting and communalism.
On April 1, 1999, the 350th anniversary of the Diggers' occupation of the English Civil War on the same hill, The Land Is Ours organised a rally, then occupied land at St. George's Hill near Weybridge, Surrey.

In 2011, an annual festival began in Wigan to celebrate the Diggers. In 2012, the second annual festival proved a great success and the sixth took place in 2016. In Wellingborough, a festival has also been held annually since 2011. Bolton Diggers were established in 2013 and have promoted the commons as a foil to privatisation. They have established community food gardens, cooperatives and the Common Wealth café, a pay-as-you-feel café using surplus food from supermarkets.

Influence on literature and popular culture
 In 1966, a faction of the San Francisco Mime Troupe formed a Diggers group in the hippie community in the Haight–Ashbury district of San Francisco.  A strongly anti-establishment group, they handed out free food in Golden Gate Park
 "The World Turned Upside Down" by Leon Rosselson, 1975, a song about the Diggers and their activities on St. George's Hill in 1649; this song was performed by Dick Gaughan on his album Handful of Earth, 1981; by the Barracudas on their album Endeavour to Persevere, 1984; by Out of the Rain on their album A Common Treasury, 1985; by Billy Bragg on his Between the Wars EP, 1985; by Chumbawamba on the b-side of their single Timebomb, 1993; by Four to the Bar on Another Son in 1995; by Attila the Stockbroker with Barnstormer on The Siege of Shoreham, 1996; by Oysterband on their albums Shouting End of life and Alive and Shouting, 1995 and 1996; by Karan Casey (formerly of the Irish band Solas), on her Songlines album, 1997; by Clandestine, a Houston-based Celtic group, on their To Anybody at All album, 1999; by the Fagans, an Australian folk group, on their album, Turning Fine, 2002; and by Seattle Celt-rock band Coventry on the album Red Hair and Black Leather, 2005; and by Vancouver punk bank The Rebel Spell on the album "Beautiful Future", 2011; and Ramshackle Glory on the album "Live the Dream", 2016; and by Melanie Gruben on the EP "Like a Tide Upon the Land", 2023.
 Winstanley, a fictionalised 1975 film portrait of the Diggers, directed by Kevin Brownlow, was based upon the novel Comrade Jacob by David Caute.
 As Meat Loves Salt by Maria McCann, Harcourt, 2001 deals in part with the founding and destruction of a fictional Digger colony at Page Common near London.
 Caryl Churchill's 1976 play Light Shining in Buckinghamshire, named after the Digger pamphlet and set in the English Civil War, charts the rise and fall of the Diggers and other social ideas from the 1640s.
 Jonathon Kemp's 2010 play The Digger's Daughter tells the tale of the Diggers and quotes much of Winstanley's teaching directly.

Writings
 Truth Lifting up its Head above Scandals (1649, dedication dated 16 October 1648), Gerrard Winstanley
 The New Law of Righteousness (26 January 1649), Gerrard Winstanley
 The True Levellers Standard ADVANCED: or, The State of Community opened, and Presented to the Sons of Men William Everard, John Palmer, John South, John Courton. William Taylor, Christopher Clifford, John Barker. Gerrard Winstanley, Richard Goodgroome, Thomas Starre, William Hoggrill, Robert Sawyer, Thomas Eder, Henry Bickerstaffe, John Taylor, &c. (20 April 1649)
 A DECLARATION FROM THE Poor oppressed People OF ENGLAND, DIRECTED To all that call themselves, or are called Lords of Manors, through this NATION... Gerrard Winstanley, John Coulton, John Palmer, Thomas Star, Samuel Webb, John Hayman, Thomas Edcer, William Hogrill, Daniel Weeden, Richard Wheeler, Nathaniel Yates, William Clifford, John Harrison, Thomas Hayden, James Hall. James Manley, Thomas Barnard, John South, Robert Sayer, Christopher Clifford, John Beechee, William Coomes, Christopher Boncher, Richard Taylor, Urian Worthington, Nathaniel Holcombe, Giles Childe (senior), John Webb, Thomas Yarwel, William Bonnington. John Ash, Ralph Ayer, John Pra, John Wilkinson, Anthony Spire, Thomas East, Allen Brown, Edward Parret, Richard Gray, John Mordy, John Bachilor, William Childe, William Hatham, Edward Wicher, William Tench. (1 June 1649).
 A LETTER TO The Lord Fairfax, AND His Councell of War, WITH Divers Questions to the Lawyers, and Ministers: Proving it an undeniable Equity, That the common People ought to dig, plow, plant and dwell upon the Commons, with-out hiring them, or paying Rent to any. On the behalf of those who have begun to dig upon George-Hill in Surrey. Gerrard Winstanly (9 June 1649)
 A Declaration of The bloudie and unchristian acting of William Star and John Taylor of Walton (22 June 1649), Gerrard Winstanley
 An Appeal To the House of Commons; desiring their answer: whether the common-people shall have the quiet enjoyment of the commons and waste land; ... (11 July 1649), Gerrard Winstanley, John Barker, and Thomas Star
 A Watch-Word to the City of London, and the Armie (26 August 1649), Gerrard Winstanley
 To His Excellency the Lord Fairfax and the Counsell of Warre the Brotherly Request of those that are called Diggers sheweth (December 1649), John Heyman, An. Wrenn, Hen. Barton, Jon Coulton (in the behalf of others called the Diggers), Robert Cosler, John Plamer, Jacob Heard (in The Clarke Papers volume 2, [1894])
 To My Lord Generall and his Councell of Warr (8 December 1649), Gerrard Winstanley (in The Clarke Papers volume 2, [1894])
 The Diggers Song (circa 1649,1650) (in The Clarke Papers volume 2, [1894]), attributed to Gerrard Winstanley by the historian C. H. Firth, the editor of The Clarke Papers.
 The Declaration and Standard of the Levellers of England, delivered in a speech to His Excellency the Lord Gen. Fairfax, on Friday last at White-Hall ..., William Everard
 Several Pieces gathered into one volume (1650, Preface dated 20 December 1649), A second edition of five of Gerrard Winstanley's works printed for Giles Calvert, the printer for nearly all the Diggers writings.
 A New-yeers Gift FOR THE PARLIAMENT AND ARMIE: SHEWING, What the KINGLY Power is; And that the CAUSE of those They call DIGGERS (1 January 1650), Gerrard Winstanley
 Englands Spirit Unfoulded or an incouragement to take the Engagement ... (Ca. February or March 1650), Jerrard  Winstanley.
 A Vindication of Those Whose Endeavors is Only to Make the Earth a Common Treasury, Called Diggers (4 March 1650), Gerrard Winstanley
 Fire in the Bush (19 March 1650), Gerrard Winstanley
 , (26 March 1650), Jerard  Winstanley [and 24 others]
 A Letter taken at Wellingborough (March 1650), probably written by Gerrard Winstanley.
 An Humble Request, to the Ministers of both Universities, and to all Lawyers in every Inns-a-court (9 April 1650), Gerrard Winstanley
 Letter to Lady Eleanor Davies (4 December 1650), Gerrard Winstanley
 The Law of Freedom in a Platform, or True Magistracy Restored (1652), Gerrard Winstanley

See also
 Christian anarchism
 Christian communism
 Christian socialism
 Pre-Marxist communism

Footnotes

References

Further reading
Books
 
 
 
 Johannes Agnoli. Subversive Theorie (Subversive Theory)
 
 The Concise Encyclopedia of the Revolutions and Wars of England, Scotland, and Ireland, 1639–1660

Articles
 
 
 
 Staff at Elmbridge Museum. Surrey Diggers Trail, facsimile at The Diggers Heritage Project
 Staff. The English Diggers (1649–50), Digger Archives
 Staff. English Dissenters: Diggers, ExLibris
 Staff. An index page: Diggers, Ranters and other radical Puritans at Street Corner Society

External links 
 A selection of Digger Pamphlets at the Ex-Classics Web Site

 
1649 establishments in England
Agrarian politics
History of agriculture in England
 
Political history of England
Socialism in England
Squatters' movements
Christian socialist organizations
Communalism
17th-century squatters